Marti Crow (born December 7, 1944) is a former Democratic member of the Kansas House of Representatives, who represented the 41st district.  She served from 1997 - 2011.  Crow did not seek re-election in 2010.
Crow has resided in Leavenworth, Kansas, since 1974.  She is an attorney/partner with Crow and Associates, along with her husband, Mike, and four other attorneys.  She received a Bachelor's degree in secondary education in 1966 from Baker University and a Juris Doctor degree from Washburn Law School in 1993.  While in law school, Crow served as an editor on the Washburn Law Review.  She graduated from law school 4th in her class and magna cum laude.  She taught eighth grade English and Social Studies for two years in the Shawnee Mission, Kansas schools 1966-68. After receiving her law license in 1993, she worked as an environmental planning consultant with the Kansas Department of Health and Environment, and as an attorney with the Kansas Department of Revenue.

Prior to her election to the House, Crow served on the Leavenworth USD 453 Board of Education (1983–1996), Leavenworth City Board of Zoning Appeals (1978-1990/1993-1996), and Leavenworth City Planning Commission (1978-1990/1993-1996).  She was a member of the 1986 class of Leadership Kansas and one of the founders of Leadership Leavenworth.  In 2009, she was named Citizen of the Year by the Leavenworth/Lansing Chamber of Commerce and honored as a "Defender of Education" by the Kansas Families for Education.

Crow grew up in an Air Force family, living in Texas, Alabama, Georgia, Missouri, Maryland, and in Germany and Okinawa in her youth.  She met her husband, Mike Crow, at Baker University during college and they married in 1968. Mike served in VietNam and was badly injured in a helicopter crash.  He and Marti spent eight months at Brooke General Hospital in San Antonio, Texas, while he recovered.  The Crows have three grown children, Jennifer, Emily and Bryan.

Issue positions
Crow's official website lists her main issues as Guantanamo detainees, family, health care, and education.

Committee membership
 Education
 Veterans, Military and Homeland Security
 Judiciary
 Interstate Cooperation
 Joint Committee on Children's Issues

Major Donors
The top 5 donors to Crow's 2008 campaign all come from professional organizations:
1. Life Science Fund of the GKC Chamber 	$1,000
2. Kansas National Education Assoc 	$1,000 	
3. Kansas Contractors Assoc 	$900 	
4. Kansas Optometric Assoc 	$750 	
5. Kansas Bankers Assoc 	$550

References

External links
 Official Website
 Kansas Legislature - Marti Crow
 Project Vote Smart profile
 Kansas Votes profile
 State Surge - Legislative and voting track record
 Follow the Money campaign contributions:
 1996,1998,2000, 2002, 2004, 2006, 2008

Democratic Party members of the Kansas House of Representatives
Living people
1944 births
Baker University alumni
Politicians from Leavenworth, Kansas
Women state legislators in Kansas
20th-century American women politicians
20th-century American politicians
21st-century American women politicians
21st-century American politicians